Nadata is a genus of moths of the family Notodontidae erected by Francis Walker in 1855.

Species
Nadata gibbosa (J. E. Smith, 1797)
Nadata oregonensis Butler, 1881

References

Notodontidae